Peter Michael Linke (born 13 March 1949) is a former Australian rules footballer who played for Geelong in the Victorian Football League (now known as the Australian Football League).

References

External links
 
 

1949 births
Living people
Geelong Football Club players
Port Fairy Football Club players
Australian rules footballers from Victoria (Australia)